Elections to North Lanarkshire Council were held on 3 May 2012 on the same day as the 31 other local authorities in Scotland. The election used the twenty wards created under the Local Governance (Scotland) Act 2004, with 70 Councillors being elected. Each ward elected either 3 or 4 members, using the STV electoral system.

The election saw Labour retain their traditional position as the largest party on the Council as they gained 1 seat from 2007 and retained their overall majority. The Scottish National Party also increased their representation and remained in second place on the authority with 3 net gains. Both the Scottish Conservative and Unionist Party and the Scottish Liberal Democrats were wiped out losing their single Council seats. Independents saw their seat numbers fall from 5 to 2 while former SNP Councillor, Alan O'Brien, was elected for the Cumbernauld Independent Councillors Alliance.

Following the election the Labour Party again formed an administration.

Election result

Note: "Votes" are the first preference votes. The net gain/loss and percentage changes relate to the result of the previous Scottish local elections on 3 May 2007. This may differ from other published sources showing gain/loss relative to seats held at dissolution of Scotland's councils.

Ward results

Kilsyth
2007: 2xLab; 1xSNP
2012: 2xLab; 1xSNP
2007-2012: No change

Cumbernauld North
2007: 2xLab; 1xSNP; 1xIndependent
2012: 2xLab; 1xCICA; 1xSNP; 
2007-2012 Change: CICA gain one seat from Independent

Cumbernauld South
2007: 2xLab; 2xSNP
2012: 2xSNP; 2xLab
2007-2012 Change: No change

Abronhill, Kildrum and the Village
2007: 2xSNP; 1xLab
2012: 2xSNP; 1xLab
2007-2012 Change: No change

Strathkelvin
2007: 3xLab; 1xSNP 
2012: 3xLab; 1xSNP
2007-2012 Change: No change

Coatbridge North and Glenboig
2007: 2xLab; 1xSNP; 1xIndependent
2012: 2xLab; 2xSNP
2007-2012 Change: SNP gain one seat from Independent

Airdrie North
2007: 2xSNP; 2xLab
2012: 2xSNP; 2xLab
2007-2012 Change: No change

Airdrie Central
2007: 1xSNP; 1xLab; 1xIndependent 
2012: 2xLab; 1xSNP
2007-2012 Change: Lab gain one seat from Independent

 

 Sitting Councillor for a different Ward.

Coatbridge West
2007: 2xLab; 1xSNP 
2012: 2xLab; 1xSNP
2007-2012 Change: No change

Coatbridge South
2007: 2xLab; 1xSNP 
2012: 2xLab; 1xSNP
2007-2012 Change: No change

Airdrie South
2007: 2xLab; 1xSNP; 1xLib Dem 
2012: 2xLab; 2xSNP
2007-2012 Change: SNP gain one seat from Lib Dem

Fortissat
2007: 1xLab; 1xIndependent; 1xSNP 
2012: 1xIndependent; 1xSNP; 1xLab
2007-2012 Change: No change

Thorniewood
2007: 2xLab; 1xSNP
2012: 2xLab; 1xSNP
2007-2012 Change: No change

Bellshill
2007: 2xLab; 1xSNP 
2012: 2xLab; 1xSNP
2007-2012 Change: No change

Mossend and Holytown
2007: 2xLab; 1xSNP 
2012: 2xLab; 1xSNP
2007-2012 Change: No change

Motherwell West
2007: 2xLab; 1xSNP 
2012: 2xLab; 1xSNP
2007-2012 Change: No change

Motherwell North
2007: 3xLab; 1xSNP 
2012: 3xLab; 1xSNP
2007-2012 Change: No change

Motherwell South East and Ravenscraig
2007: 2xLab; 1xSNP; 1xCon 
2012: 3xLab; 1xSNP
2007-2012 Change: Lab gain one seat from Con

Murdostoun
2007: 2xLab; 1xSNP; 1xIndependent 
2012: 2xLab; 1xIndependent; 1xSNP
2007-2012 Change: No change

Wishaw
2007: 3xLab; 1xSNP
2012: 2xLab; 2xSNP
2007-2012 Change: SNP gain one seat from Lab

Changes Since Election
† Strathkelvin Scottish National Party Cllr Frances McGlinchey resigned from the party on 24 October 2012 in protest at the vote to overturn its long-standing opposition to Nato. 
†† Coatbridge West Labour Party Cllr Tom Maginnis died on 29 November 2012. A by-election was held on 28 February 2013 and the seat was retained by Labour's Kevin Docherty.
††† Motherwell North Labour Party Cllr Annita McAuley died on 23 October 2013. A by-election was held on 23 January 2014 and the seat was retained by Labour's Pat O'Rourke.
†††† Airdrie North and Murdostoun SNP Cllrs Alan Beveridge and John Taggart resigned from the party and became Independents on 10 February 2015 in opposition to the party's 2015 Westminster Election selection procedures.
††††† Thorniewood SNP Cllr Duncan McShannon resigned his seat in May 2015. A by-election was held on 9 July 2015 and the seat was held by the party's Stephen Bonnar.
†††††† Wishaw SNP Cllr Marion Fellows was elected as an MP for Motherwell and Wishaw on 7 May 2015. She resigned her Council seat on 25 May 2015 and a by-election was held 13 August 2015 and the seat was held by the party's Rosa Zambonini.
††††††† On 8 March 2016 Labour Party Motherwell North Cllrs Helen McKenna and Peter Nolan, Wishaw Cllr Sam Love and Coatbridge West Cllr Jim Smith resigned from the party and became Independents.
†††††††† Coatbridge North and Glenboig Cllr Fulton James McGregor was elected as a MSP for Coatbridge and Chryston in the 2016 Scottish Parliament election. On 29 June 2016 he resigned his council seat. A by-election was held on 22 September 2016 which was won by Labour's Alex McVey.
††††††††† Motherwell South East and Ravenscraig and Wishaw Labour Party Cllrs Gary O'Rorke and Frank McKay resigned from the party and became Independents on 21 November 2016.
†††††††††† Airdrie South Labour Cllr David Fagan was suspended from the party on 4 October 2016 over allegations of possession of child pornography.
††††††††††† Airdrie South Labour Cllr Tom Curley resigned from the party on 29 October 2016 and announced he would stand as an Independent in 2016.

By-elections since 2012

References

External links
3 May 2012 - North Lanarkshire Council - results
Local Election Results 2012

2012
2012 Scottish local elections